Who Was the Man? is a 1921 American short silent Western film directed by Lee Kohlmar, released by Universal Film Mfg. Co. and featuring Hoot Gibson.

Plot

Cast
 Hoot Gibson
 Charles Newton
 Jacques Jaccard
 Marcella Pershing
 Ben Corbett
 John Judd

See also
 Hoot Gibson filmography

External links
 

1921 films
1921 Western (genre) films
1921 short films
American silent short films
American black-and-white films
Films directed by Lee Kohlmar
Silent American Western (genre) films
Films with screenplays by George H. Plympton
1920s American films
1920s English-language films